Toe Kyaw Man Nae Nan San Tae Ywar is a 2018 Burmese comedy film, directed by Kyaw Thar Gyi starring Kyaw Ye Aung, Pyay Ti Oo, Bay Lu Wa, Aye Myat Thu and Thinzar Wint Kyaw. The film, produced by Celebrity Film Production, premiered Myanmar on July 6, 2018.

Cast
Pyay Ti Oo as Pyay Toe
Kyaw Ye Aung as Kyaw Yan Aung
Bay Lu Wa as Lu Man
Aye Myat Thu as Thakhin Ma
Thinzar Wint Kyaw as Phyu Phway
May Sue Maung
Moe Pwint Phyu

References

2018 films
2010s Burmese-language films
Burmese comedy films
Films shot in Myanmar
2018 comedy films